Satiful Bahri bin Mamat is a Malaysian politician and currently serves as Terengganu State Executive Councillor.

Election Results

Honours
  :
  Companion of the Order of Sultan Mizan Zainal Abidin of Terengganu (SMZ) (2019)
  Knight Commander of the Order of the Crown of Terengganu (DPMT) – Dato' (2022)

References

Living people
People from Terengganu
Malaysian people of Malay descent
Malaysian Muslims
Malaysian Islamic Party politicians
Members of the Terengganu State Legislative Assembly
Terengganu state executive councillors
21st-century Malaysian politicians
1967 births